Narsaq is a town in the Kujalleq municipality in southern Greenland. The name Narsaq is Kalaallisut for "Plain", referring to the shore of Tunulliarfik Fjord where the town is located.

History 
People have lived in the area for thousands of years, but not continuously. Remains of the Norse settlement can be found in the area. The church ruins of Dyrnæs can be found on the north-western outskirts of the town. The Landnám homestead, Landnamsgaarden, can be found immediately to the west of the town. Dated to the year 1000, the homestead is among the oldest of the Norse ruins in the area. Excavation of the ruins began in 1953 with the discovery of the Narsaq stick, the first Viking Age runic inscription discovered in Greenland. The wider Narsaq area has some of the most striking Norse artefacts and ruins. Erik the Red's Brattahlid is located in present-day Qassiarsuk, and the Gardar bishop seat is in present-day Igaliku.

Present day Narsaq was founded as Nordprøven ("North Prøven") in 1830, distinguishing it from Sydprøven ("South Prøven", modern Alluitsup Paa) established the same year. The initial settlement was founded as a trading colony of Qaqortoq, then named Julianehaab.

A trading center was established here due to the natural deep water harbor which could accommodate ocean faring vessels, . Initially local seal hunters traded blubber and seal skin for continental goods, such as coffee, sugar, bread and buckwheat.

Until approximately 1900 seal hunting formed the main economy for Narsaq. In the early 1900s seal hunting began to fail, and the main basis for the economy gradually shifted to fishing. The city's historical fishing village is from 1914. The main house of the historical village today houses the power company in the city.

Simiutak at the Skovfjord mouth near Narsaq was a HF/DF radio range finding station called Bluie West Three during World War II. The station commenced operations in January 1942, and was permanently staffed until the end of the war.

The population also increased during this period, from 25 in 1870, to 162 in 1919, and to 300 in 1930. However the settlement did not experience significant population growth until 1953, when its first prawn and fishing factory of Royal Greenland was established. The factory was subsequently closed in 2010.

In 1959 the population exceeded 600, and Narsaq achieved town status,. With 1,346 inhabitants as of 2020, it is the ninth-largest town in Greenland. Several hundred people live in the surrounding community.

The town is notable for the 1990 Narsaq massacre, a mass shooting where seven people were killed and one was wounded. The shooting was the worst in Greenland's history.

Until December 31, 2008, the town was the administrative center of Narsaq Municipality in the Kitaa amt. In addition to the town, the municipality consisted of the Qassiarsuk, Igaliku and Narsarsuaq settlements, as well as several sheep and reindeer farms. On January 1, 2009, Narsaq became part of Kujalleq municipality, when the Kitaa amt, as well as the municipalities of Narsaq, Qaqortoq, and Nanortalik ceased to exist as administrative entities.

Economy

Fishing 
Fishing is the mainstay of the local economy. Local fjords are full of marine life, including whales, salmon, and seals.

Sheep farming 
Farming is possible on the plains to the north of the town, with several actively maintained arable fields. Of the 53 registered sheep farms in Greenland, 31 are located in the Narsaq area. The farms produce meat for domestic consumption, and the Narsaq slaughterhouse Neqi A/S, a wholly owned subsidiary of KNI, is the only slaughterhouse in the country. The sheep farming area of Tasiusaq is located in former Norse area.

Tourism 
The third major part of the economy is tourism. South Greenland has experienced a decline in tourist revenue in recent years, but tourism still supports a significant percentage of the viable workforce. Popular activities include hiking, fishing, collecting rare minerals and taking boat trips to the ice cap.

Services and infrastructure 

Today Narsaq has a town hall, two supermarkets, a church, a police station, a firestation, a primary school, several educational facilities, an internet café, a hospital, and several small shops. Greenland's first brewery, Greenland Brewhouse, was established in Narsaq in 2004.

The town hospital is housed in a two-storey building and has 14 beds. The town health services also include a dental clinic.

Narsaq church was designed by local carpenter Pavia Høegh in 1927. The church was refurbished and expanded in 1981.

The only Food Science College in the country is located in Narsaq. The school, INUILI, is the main education center for chefs in Greenland, and it has a staff of 20.

Transport

Air 

Narsaq Heliport operates year-round, linking Narsaq with Qaqortoq on the shores of Labrador Sea, and thus with Arctic Umiaq off-season route endpoint. It also links Narsaq with the large Narsarsuaq Airport, and indirectly with the rest of Greenland and Europe.

Sea 
The harbor of Narsaq is a natural coastal harbor with steep depth. Narsaq is a port of call for the Arctic Umiaq Line coastal ship in the summer season. The port can accommodate deep seagoing vessels due to the steep depth of the shore. The port authority for Narsaq is Royal Arctic Line, located in Nuuk. Port pilotage is available upon request, and is recommended.

Land 

In contrast to the rest of Greenland, the wider Narsaq area has a relatively extensive network of traversable dirt and gravel roads, totalling over 120 kilometers and requiring DKK 500,000 annually for service. The longest stretch of road envelopes the northern end of Tunulliarfik Fjord, and connects the sheep farms of Qassiarsuk with the airport of Narsarsuaq. The roads are generally of poor construction, lacking crossfall for drainage, and using softer sandstone instead of harder granite, creating severe dust problems in the summer. For general transportation all-terrain vehicles are recommended. During winter dog sled routes are important transport links to the surrounding area.

Population 
With 1,346 inhabitants , Narsaq is the second-largest town in the Kujalleq municipality. The population has decreased 25% relative to the 1990 levels, and has been decreasing over the last several years. Most towns and settlements in southern Greenland exhibit negative growth patterns over the last two decades, with many settlements rapidly depopulating.

Climate 
Narsaq has a tundra climate (ET) moderated by the Gulf Stream, with cool summers and cold winters.

Twin towns 
Narsaq is twinned with:
  Gladsaxe, Denmark
  Vigo, Spain
  Akureyri, Iceland

References

Populated places in Greenland
Populated places established in 1830
1830 establishments in Greenland